The Hong Kong women's national football team represents Hong Kong in international women's football.

Results and fixtures

The following is a list of match results in the last 12 months, as well as any future matches that have been scheduled.

Legend

2022

2023

Coaching staff

Players

Current squad
The following players have been selected to the squad for 2023 Turkish Women's Cup.

Recent call-ups
The following players have been called up to the squad in the past 12 months.

Records

*Players in bold are still active, at least at club level.

Most capped players

Top goalscorers

Competitive record

FIFA Women's World Cup

*Draws include knockout matches decided on penalty kicks.

Olympic Games

*Draws include knockout matches decided on penalty kicks.

AFC Women's Asian Cup

*Draws include knockout matches decided on penalty kicks.

Asian Games

*Draws include knockout matches decided on penalty kicks.

EAFF E-1 Football Championship

Turkish Women's Cup

See also

Sport in Hong Kong
Football in Hong Kong
Women's football in Hong Kong
Hong Kong men's national football team

References

External links
 Official website, HKFA.com 
 FIFA profile, FIFA.com 

Asian women's national association football teams
nat
W